Robert Merrihew Adams  (born September 8, 1937) is an American analytic philosopher, specializing in metaphysics, philosophy of religion, ethics, and the history of early modern philosophy.

Life and career 
Adams was born on September 8, 1937, in Philadelphia, Pennsylvania. He taught for many years at the University of California, Los Angeles, before moving to Yale University in the early 1990s as the Clark Professor of Moral Philosophy and Metaphysics. As chairman, he helped revive the philosophy department after its near-collapse due to personal and scholarly conflicts between analytical and Continental philosophers. Adams retired from Yale in 2004 and taught part-time at the University of Oxford in England, where he was a senior research fellow of Mansfield College. In 2009 he became a Distinguished Research Professor of Philosophy at the University of North Carolina at Chapel Hill.

Adams's late wife, Marilyn McCord Adams, was also a philosopher, working on medieval philosophy and the philosophy of religion and was the Regius Professor of Divinity at Christ Church, Oxford. In 2013 both became visiting research professors at Rutgers University, in conjunction with the founding of the Rutgers Center for the Philosophy of Religion.

He is a past president of the Society of Christian Philosophers. In 1999, he delivered the Gifford Lectures on "God and Being". He was elected a Fellow of the British Academy in 2006 and was elected a Fellow of the American Academy of Arts and Sciences in 1991.

Philosophical work 

As a historical scholar, Adams has published on the work of the philosophers Søren Kierkegaard and G.W. Leibniz. His work in the philosophy of religion includes influential essays on the problem of evil and the relation between theism and ethics. In metaphysics, Adams defends actualism in metaphysics of modality and Platonism about the nature of so-called possible worlds.

Selected works 
 . Reprinted in The Virtue of Faith and Other Essay in Philosophical Theology below.
 "A Modified Divine Command Theory of Ethical Wrongness" in Religion and Morality: A Collection of Essays. eds. Gene Outka and John P. Reeder. New York: Doubleday. Reprinted in  The Virtue of Faith.
 
 
 
 "Actualism and Thisness", Synthèse, XLIX 3–41. 1981.
 
 The Virtue of Faith and Other Essays in Philosophical Theology. New York: Oxford University Press. 1987.
 
 "Divine Commands and the Social Nature of Obligation" Faith and Philosophy, 1987.
 "The Knight of Faith", Faith and Philosophy, 1990.
 "Moral Faith", Journal of Philosophy, 1995.
 Leibniz: Determinist, Theist, Idealist. New York: Oxford. 1994.
 "Things in Themselves", Philosophy and Phenomenological Research, 1997.
 Finite and Infinite Goods. New York: Oxford University Press. 1999.
 A Theory of Virtue: Excellence in Being for the Good. Oxford: Clarendon Press. 2006.
 What Is, and What Is In Itself: A Systematic Ontology. Oxford: Oxford University Press, 2021.

References

External links 
 Gifford Lecture Series
 "Philosophy Takes Steps to Rebuild", Yale Daily News

1937 births
20th-century American non-fiction writers
20th-century American philosophers
20th-century essayists
21st-century American non-fiction writers
21st-century American philosophers
21st-century essayists
American ethicists
American logicians
American male essayists
American male non-fiction writers
American metaphysics writers
American philosophy academics
American Presbyterians
Analytic philosophers
Christian philosophers
Consequentialists
Epistemologists
Fellows of Mansfield College, Oxford
Fellows of the American Academy of Arts and Sciences
Fellows of the British Academy
Historians of philosophy
Living people
Metaphysicians
Ontologists
Philosophers from North Carolina
Philosophers from Pennsylvania
Philosophers of history
Philosophers of logic
Philosophers of religion
Presidents of the Society of Christian Philosophers
University of North Carolina at Chapel Hill faculty
Writers from Philadelphia
Yale University faculty
20th-century American male writers
21st-century American male writers